William Allestry may refer to:
William Allestry (1588–1655), English politician, MP for Derby
William Allestry (died 1590s), MP for Derby
William Allestry (died 1700) (c. 1642–c. 1700), English lawyer and politician, MP for Derby